The Pará-class monitors were a group of six wooden-hulled ironclad monitors named after Brazilian provinces and built in Brazil for the Imperial Brazilian Navy during the Paraguayan War in the late 1860s. Afterwards the remaining ships joined the first three and they all provided fire support for the army for the rest of the war. The ships were split between the newly formed Upper Uruguay and Mato Grosso Flotillas after the war. Alagoas was transferred to Rio de Janeiro in the 1890s and participated in the Fleet Revolt of 1893–94.

Design and description
The Pará-class river monitors were designed to meet the need of the Brazilian Navy for small, shallow-draft armored ships capable of withstanding heavy fire during the Paraguayan War, which saw Argentina and Brazil allied against Paraguay. The two foreign-built river monitors already in service drew enough water that they could not operate on the shallower rivers in Paraguay. The monitor configuration was chosen as a turreted design did not have the same problems engaging enemy ships and fortifications as did the casemate ironclads already in Brazilian service. The oblong gun turret sat on a circular platform that had a central pivot. It was rotated by four men via a system of gears; 2.25 minutes were required for a full 360° rotation. A bronze ram was fitted to these ships as well. The hull was sheathed with Muntz metal to reduce biofouling.

With only  of freeboard they had to be towed between Rio de Janeiro and their area of operations. Their crew numbered 43 officers and men.

Propulsion
The Pará-class ships had two direct-acting steam engines, each driving a single  propeller. The ships carried enough coal for one day's steaming.

Armament
The first three ships carried a single 70-pounder Whitworth rifled muzzle loader (RML) in their gun turret, but the last three ships substituted a 120-pounder Whitworth RML. The 70-pdr gun had a maximum elevation of 15°, but the larger gun's elevation was reduced because of its longer barrel. Most unusually the guns' Brazilian-designed iron carriage was designed to pivot vertically at the muzzle; this was done to minimize the size of the gunport through which splinters and shells could enter.

Armor
The hull of the Pará-class ships was made from three layers of wood that alternated in orientation.

The gun turret was shaped like a rectangle with rounded corners. Its roof and the exposed portions of the platform it rested upon were protected by 12.7 millimeters of armor. The armored pilothouse was positioned ahead of the turret.

Construction

Service history

The first three ships finished, Pará, Alagoas and Rio Grande, participated in the Passage of Humaitá on 19 February 1868. Both Alagoas, which had taken an estimated 200 hits, and Pará had to be beached after passing the fortress to prevent them from sinking. Alagoas was under repair at São José do Cerrito until mid-March, although Pará joined a squadron to capture the town of Laureles on 27 February. Rio Grande continued upstream with the other undamaged ships and they bombarded Asunción on 24 February with little effect. On 23 March Rio Grande and Barroso sank the Parguayan steamer Igurey and both ships were boarded by Paraguayan soldiers on the evening of 9 July, although they managed to repel the boarders.

For the rest of the war the river monitors bombarded Paraguayan positions and artillery batteries in support of the army, notably at Angostura, Timbó and along the Tebicuary and Manduvirá Rivers. After the war the ships were divided between the newly formed Upper Uruguay and Mato Grosso Flotillas. Alagoas was transferred to Rio de Janeiro in the 1890s and participated in the Fleet Revolt of 1893–1894. The ships were disposed of during the last two decades of the 19th century, although Rio Grande was docked for reconstruction in 1899. The work was never completed and she was eventually scrapped in 1907.

See also 
 List of ironclads

Notes

References

External links
 Alphabetical listing of Brazilian warships 

Ships built in Brazil
 
Monitor classes
Riverine warfare